Mitsubishi Electric Hydronics & IT Cooling Systems SpA (MEHITS) is the Mitsubishi Electric Group company specialized in hydronic systems for air conditioning and IT Cooling. Based in Italy the company designs and manufactures in 12 production plants in Europe, China, and India, and distributes its products worldwide.

History 

Mitsubishi Electric Hydronics & IT Cooling Systems SpA was established in 2017, after the acquisition of the previous company DeLclima, which belonged to the De’Longhi Group, by Mitsubishi Electric, in 2015.

MEHITS believes and invests heavily in patenting not only through innovative technologies applied to new products but also its own facilities like the new ML21 Testing Center in Belluno, unique in its kind for the different types of tests that can be carried out inside.

References

External links 
 

Heating, ventilation, and air conditioning companies
Engineering companies of Italy
Italian companies established in 2017
Italian brands
Companies of Italy
Companies based in Veneto
Companies based in Vicenza